Shamim Ahmad (born 6 January 1972) is an Indian politician belonging to Rashtriya Janata Dal. He was elected as a member of Bihar Legislative Assembly from Narkatiya in 2015 and 2020.

References

Living people
Rashtriya Janata Dal politicians
Bihar MLAs 2015–2020
Bihar MLAs 2020–2025
1972 births